"DOA" is the second song released as a single from Foo Fighters' fifth album, In Your Honor.

Song information

DOA refers to the medical term "dead on arrival". The song reached number one on Billboard's Hot Modern Rock Tracks chart for six non-consecutive weeks. The cover artwork features an Ampeg Dan Armstrong guitar.

Live Performances

The band claimed it was the hardest song from In Your Honor to play live. "DOA" was played often on the In Your Honor tour and the Echoes Silence Patience and Grace tour. It was played just once on the Wasting Light tour. It was not played again until the Sonic Highways tour in 2015, where it was requested by a group of fans. It hasn't been played live since then.

In other media
"DOA" has also been released as a Rock Band and Rock Band 2 DLC track on Xbox Live and PlayStation Network on December 23, 2008.

Track listings

Personnel
 Dave Grohl – vocals, rhythm guitar
 Chris Shiflett – lead guitar
 Nate Mendel – bass
 Taylor Hawkins – drums

Charts

Weekly charts

Year-end charts

Certifications

Other versions
An early version of the song, listed as a demo, was released on the CD1 version of the "Resolve" single and Five Songs and a Cover.
A version recorded on August 23, 2005 at Maida Vale Studios in London for the BBC Radio 1  was released on the Radio 1's Live Lounge compilation.
A live version filmed at Hyde Park on June 17, 2006 was released on the Live at Hyde Park DVD.

References

2005 singles
Foo Fighters songs
Songs written by Dave Grohl
Songs written by Taylor Hawkins
Songs written by Nate Mendel
Songs written by Chris Shiflett
Song recordings produced by Nick Raskulinecz